Events in the year 1959 in Turkey.

Parliament
 11th Parliament of Turkey

Incumbents
President – Celal Bayar
Prime Minister – Adnan Menderes
Leader of the opposition – İsmet İnönü

Ruling party and the main opposition
  Ruling party – Democrat Party (DP) 
  Main opposition – Republican People's Party (CHP)

Cabinet
23rd government of Turkey

Events
 11 February – Zürich Agreement concerning the Cyprus issue
17 February – Turkish Airlines aircraft SEC crashed in London. Prime minister Adnan Menderes survived 
18 February  – London Agreement concerning the Cyprus issue 
1 May – Opposition leader İsmet İnönü got attacked in Uşak
4 May – Opposition leader İsmet İnönü got attacked in Istanbul (Topkapı event).
14 June – Fenerbahçe won the championship of the Turkish football league
27 September – Kasım Gülek, the secretary general of CHP resigned

Births
12 February – Ercan Akbay, writer, painter and musician
26 February – Ahmet Davutoğlu, prime minister
3 May – Tuğba Çetin (Ahu Tuğba), actress
15 July – Bergen Sarılmışer, singer
27 November – Gani Müjde scriptwriter
23 December – Demet Akbağ, theatre actress

Deaths
10 January – Şükrü Kaya (aged 76), former government minister (5th – 9th government of Turkey)
14 march – Faik Ahmet Barutçu (aged 63), former deputy prime minister (17th government of Turkey)
16 September – Süleyman Hilmi Tunahan, Islamic scholar
24 October – Osman Nihat Akın, composer

Gallery

See also
 1959 Milli Lig

References

 
Years of the 20th century in Turkey